205 (two hundred [and] five) is the natural number following 204 and preceding 206.

In mathematics
205 is a lucky number, and a Wolstenholme number.
On an infinite chessboard, a knight can reach exactly 205 squares within four moves. There are 205 different ways of forming a connected graph by adding six edges to a set of five labeled vertices.

In other fields 

 The atomic number of an element temporarily called Binilpentium

See also
 List of highways numbered 205
 205 Martha, a large Main belt asteroid
 205 Yonge Street, a building in Toronto
 205 series, a commuter train type in Japan
 Peugeot 205, a French car
 WWE 205 Live, an American professional wrestling program

References

Integers